Katy Mixon (born March 30, 1981) is an American actress. She began her career playing supporting roles in films such as The Quiet (2005), Four Christmases (2008), and State of Play (2009), before landing the female leading role in the HBO comedy series Eastbound & Down (2009–2013).

From 2010 to 2016, Mixon starred as Victoria Flynn, sister to Melissa McCarthy's character, on the CBS sitcom Mike & Molly. She had dramatic parts in films Take Shelter (2011), Drive Angry (2011), and Hell or High Water (2016), and did voice over work in Minions (2015). From 2016 to 2021, Mixon starred as the lead character Katie Otto in the ABC sitcom American Housewife.

Early life
Mixon was born and raised in Pensacola, Florida; she is one of seven siblings. She attended the Alabama School of Fine Arts in Birmingham, Alabama and graduated from the Pensacola Private School of Liberal Arts. She received her Bachelor of Fine Arts from the Carnegie Mellon School of Drama.

Career
Mixon's first acting job came in 2001, playing Calpurnia in the Utah Shakespearean Festival's presentation of Shakespeare's Julius Caesar. Mixon moved to Los Angeles in 2003. In 2005, she starred in the premiere of the interactive theater play American Standard at the Los Angeles Edgefest. Mixon has performed at Upright Cabaret.

Mixon made her motion picture debut in the 2005 thriller film The Quiet starring Elisha Cuthbert, playing the character Michelle Fell. The next year she appeared in the romantic comedy Blind Dating playing a secondary role. Mixon had a bigger role in the 2008 comedy film Four Christmases playing Jon Favreau's younger wife. In 2009, she had roles in three films: crime drama The Informers, political thriller State of Play, and  a Razzie-winning comedy All About Steve. Also from 2009 until 2013 she starred as April Buchanon in the HBO baseball comedy series Eastbound & Down opposite Danny McBride.

In 2010, Mixon was cast as Victoria Flynn in the CBS comedy series Mike & Molly opposite Melissa McCarthy and Swoosie Kurtz. Vanity Fair described her role as "the funniest part" of the sitcom. The series ended in 2016 after six seasons and 127 episodes. During her time on Mike & Molly, Mixon co-starred alongside Jessica Chastain and Michael Shannon in the critically acclaimed independent drama film Take Shelter which was released in 2011. She had a role in the action film Drive Angry (2011) which starred Nicolas Cage; she voiced Tina Nelson in Minions (2015) as well. In 2016, she appeared alongside Jeff Bridges and Chris Pine in the critically acclaimed crime film Hell or High Water.

In 2016, Mixon was cast in the first leading role of her career on the ABC comedy series American Housewife created by Sarah Dunn. Mixon received positive reviews from critics for her performance as Katie Otto. She was included in People's “One to Watch” list. The series was canceled in 2021 after 103 episodes. In 2022, Mixon played Betsy Faria in the NBC miniseries The Thing About Pam detailing the involvement of Pam Hupp in the 2011 murder of Betsy Faria. Later that year, she was cast opposite Jessica Chastain in the Showtime musical drama miniseries George & Tammy.

Personal life
Mixon is married to former track and field athlete Breaux Greer, and they have two children.

Filmography

Film

Television

References

External links 

 

1981 births
21st-century American actresses
Actresses from Florida
American film actresses
American television actresses
Carnegie Mellon University College of Fine Arts alumni
Living people
People from Pensacola, Florida